Jan Trussell (Janet_Trussell) is a former competitor in judo, freestyle wrestling and sambo.  She won the US National Championships in sambo.  Trussell also won the US National Championship in judo.  She is a multiple time winner in the World Sambo Championships. She is the sister of Rebecca Trussell.

References

External links
 https://www.judoinside.com/judoka/6022/Janet_Trussell/judo-career

Date of birth missing (living people)
Living people
American female judoka
American sambo practitioners
Sambokas at the 1983 Pan American Games
Year of birth missing (living people)
21st-century American women
Pan American Games gold medalists for the United States
Medalists at the 1983 Pan American Games